Ittefaq (English: Coincidence) is a 2001 Indian Hindi-language action comedy film directed by Sanjay Khanna. It stars  Sunil Shetty, Pooja Batra and Mukul Dev in pivotal roles. Pop musician Remo Fernandes also makes a special appearance in this film.

Plot
Efficient ex cop-turned hit man Shiva (Sunil Shetty) takes on a contract to find Vikram (Mukul Dev) who has been an eyewitness to a murder committed by crime boss Jindal (Mohan Joshi) and bring him back to Mumbai. But he soon finds himself protecting the boy and his girlfriend instead, and fighting the people who sent him in the first place.

Cast

 Sunil Shetty - Shiv Kumar 'Shiva'
 Mukul Dev - Vikram Singh
 Pooja Batra - Roshni G. Hiranandani
 Anupama Verma - Anu
 Tiku Talsania - ACP Gaitonde
 Shakti Kapoor -  ACP Rathod
 Puneet Issar - Inspector Thakur
 Mushtaq Khan - Batak Lal
 Shiva Rindani - Banta
 Shehzad Khan - Santa
 Ishrat Ali - Manek Rao
 Ashok Saraf -  Shambhu Shikari
 Arun Bakshi - ACP Anand Verma
 Mohan Joshi - S.K. Jindal
 Kader Khan - Gujjumal Hiranandani
 Razzak Khan - Pandit
 Dinesh Hingoo - Gangaram
 Anjana Mumtaz - Vikram's Mother 
 Raju Shrestha - Nilesh Panjwani
 Rakesh Bedi - Constable Pandit
 Pappu Polyester
Nawab Shah - Bakhtawar

Soundtrack

The music of the film is composed  Dilip Sen-Sameer Sen and the lyrics were penned by Sameer. The soundtrack was released in 2001 on Audio Cassette and Audio Cds in Zee Music, which consists of 6 songs The full album is recorded by Abhijeet, Alka Yagnik, Babul Supriyo , Hema Sardesai, Sunidhi Chauhan Jaspinder Narula and Remo Fernandes

References

External links

2000s Hindi-language films
2001 films
Films scored by Dilip Sen-Sameer Sen